Putnam County is a county located in the U.S. state of New York. As of the 2020 census, the population was 97,668. The county seat is Carmel. Putnam County formed in 1812 from Dutchess County and is named for Israel Putnam, a hero in the French and Indian War and a general in the American Revolutionary War.

Putnam County is included in the New York-Newark-Jersey City, NY-NJ-PA Metropolitan Statistical Area. It is located in the lower Hudson River Valley. Midtown Manhattan is around a one-hour drive, and Grand Central Terminal is approximately one hour and twenty minutes by train from the county.

It is one of the most affluent counties in America, ranked 21st by median household income, and 43rd by per-capita income, according to the 2012 American Community Survey and 2009-2013 American Community Survey, respectively.

History

In 1609, the Wappinger Native American people inhabited the east bank of the Hudson River. They farmed, hunted, and fished throughout their range, often encountering Dutch fur traders. They obtained metal tools and goods such as alcohol and firearms in exchange for furs.

Dutchess county was organized as one of New York's twelve counties. It included all of today's Putnam County and two towns in the present Columbia county. Until 1713, Dutchess was administered by Ulster county.

In 1691, a group of Dutch traders purchased a tract of land from the Wappingers that spanned from the Hudson River to the Connecticut border. Six years later they sold it to wealthy Dutch-American merchant Adolphus Philipse, who obtained a Royal sanction for a "Highland Patent" (later to be known as the Philipse Patent) that encompassed most of today's Putnam County.  Unknown at that time was a northwest veer in the river's path at the Hudson Highlands. This generated a dispute over a roughly 2-mile-wide section of border between northern Westchester County, then-Dutchess County, and the Connecticut Colony, which came to be known as "The Oblong".

In 1737, the New York Colonial Assembly designated the Philipse Patent as the South Precinct of Dutchess County. The Philipses began leasing farms to migrants from Massachusetts, Connecticut, Long Island, and lower Westchester. After Adolph Philipse's death, the Patent was divided in 1754 into nine lots granted to three heirs: Mary Philipse, Philip Philipse, and Susannah Philipse Robinson. During the French and Indian War, many of the Wappinger went to Stockbridge, Massachusetts.

Compared to other parts of the Hudson Valley, Putnam County had slow settlement. It was privately owned and settlement was limited to tenant farmers willing to pay  the Philipse family for leases. Secondly, it was mostly hilly and rocky, making it unappealing to men looking for tillable cropland. Its use was generally limited to dairy farming and wood cutting. The first non-tenant settlers in the county were along its eastern edge. The ambiguous border with Connecticut attracted farmers from New England. They assumed that Philipse did not own the disputed area.

Among early settlers were the Hayt family, which built a farm called The Elm in 1720. Jacob Haviland settled in the Oblong in 1731 in what became known as Haviland Hollow.  The first village in the county was Fredericksburg, now the hamlet of Patterson.

During the American Revolution, the Philipses stayed loyal to the Crown. As a consequence, their lands were confiscated by the New York government. It sold the Philipse Patent along with the rest of their holdings. The dispute over The Oblong was resolved in the aftermath of the war, with the heavily settled tract being incorporated as the first of two versions of the Town of Southeast. Also resolved were two "Gores", the Beekman Gore and the Rombout Gore, which being geographically similar to the Livingston and Beekman patents they abutted, were ceded by the Philipses to Dutchess County in 1758 and 1771 respectively.

Due to the increasing population of the Southern Precinct of Dutchess County and the great distance of these communities from the county seat in Poughkeepsie, Putnam was split from Dutchess in 1812 and organized as an independent county. It encompassed all of the Philipse Patent and the Oblong abutting it, less a triangular area in the farthest northwest reach of the Patent.  There, a lowland near Fishkill Creek isolated from the rest of Putnam County and its adjacent upland drainage leading into the Hudson Highlands to the south, were ceded to Dutchess.

Putnam travelers mostly used boats and ships along the Hudson River. Boats transporting goods traveled up the Hudson to ports, mainly at Peekskill, New York. They were transported by road into Putnam County, or goods were unloaded in Putnam County at Cold Spring, New York. Such transport suffered in winter, when the river froze. At that time, little food or goods could be shipped to the county.

The Philipstown Turnpike was created in 1815 as a toll road from Cold Spring to Connecticut. The wagons that traveled the road would transport produce from eastern Putnam County and iron ore from the mines. The route of the turnpike can roughly be traced today: Rt 301 from Cold Spring to Farmers Mills Road, to White Pond Road to Pecksville, then Holmes Rd to Patterson, then Quaker Hill Rd to Connecticut. Transportation improved with the advent of the railroad, namely the Harlem Line, which was built in the 1840s, connecting Putnam by rail to New York City. Originally there were four stations on the Harlem line in Putnam County: Brewster, Dykemans, Towners, and Patterson. Today only the Brewster and Patterson stops remain; a new one called Southeast was added in modern times.

Putnam County played an important role in the Civil War. One third of the county's men between the ages of 15 and 55 served in the military during the war years. During the post-Civil War years, industry and agriculture suffered losses as the economy contracted. Iron, which was produced in the Highland Mountains, could be found elsewhere. Agriculture was also affected greatly. The increasing need for drinking water in New York City led the city to search for sources in the Hudson Valley. In Putnam County, much of the farmland was flooded to create reservoirs as part of New York City's Croton Watershed. The abandoning of farms, the creation of reservoirs, and the preservation of the remaining open land resulted in scenic lands that drew large amounts of tourism from New York City.

By the 20th century, improved roads brought vacationers from New York City. The Taconic State Parkway was constructed during the Great Depression as one of numerous infrastructure projects in the state and country. This brought more vacationers from the city, who were attracted to the scenic lands and the inexpensive hotels, inns, and summer houses. Putnam County's population doubled during the summer months.

After World War II, Putnam County became an exurb of New York City. Rapid residential development occurred and the county became a bedroom community. However, the prevalent rocky uplands and protection of Putnam county's reservoirs inherently limited development, as much of the land in the county is close to wetlands or reservoirs.

Government and politics

Governmental operations in Putnam County are outlined in the County Charter, which was approved by the voters of the County in November 1977. It is administered by a County Executive, elected at-large, and a 9-member County Legislature, elected from single-member districts.

The current County Executive is Republican Kevin M. Byrne (R) After serving the state of New York for 6 years as the Assemblyman of the 94th district, he won the Republican nomination for Putnam County Executive and then went unopposed in the general election.

Prior to the Charter form of government, the county's affairs were managed by Board of Supervisors, with one Supervisor from each of the county's six towns. As these had populations of differing size, these geographic districts violated the principle of "one man, one vote."

County Executives
The county has had six County Executives:

County Legislature
The current members of the county legislature for the 2022-2023 session are as follows:
  01 - Nancy Montgomery (D)
  02 - William Gouldman (R)
  03 - Toni Addonizio (R)
  04 - Ginny Nacerino (R)
  05 - Greg Ellner (R)
  06 - Paul Jonke (R), Deputy Chair
  07 - Joseph Castellano (R)
  08 - Amy Sayegh (R)
  09 - Erin L. Crowley (R), Chair

County Legislators are elected for three-year terms, and since 2011 are limited to four three-year terms in office.  Legislative terms are staggered so that one-third of the legislative is elected each year.

  *The County Charter took effect on January 1, 1979, and the County Legislature was established on that day.  The County Board of Supervisors was dissolved on the previous day and members of the County Legislature for the year 1979 were the supervisors of each of the six towns.  Ethel Forkell was Supervisor of the Town of Kent and was elected by her colleagues as the first Chair of the County Legislature.

County Courts
There are three types of general trial courts in Putnam County: the New York Supreme Court, the County Court and the Justice Courts. The Supreme Court is the trial level court of the New York State Unified Court System, which presents some confusion as the Supreme Court is the highest court of appeals in the federal system as well as in most states, whereas the Court of Appeals is the highest court in New York. The Supreme Court has broad authority over all categories of cases, both civil and criminal. Generally the Supreme Court in Putnam hears civil cases involving claims in excess of $25,000. While the Supreme Court has jurisdiction over criminal cases in most counties this is handled by the County Courts. In Putnam however, the Supreme Court does exercise jurisdiction over some criminal cases.

The County Court is authorized to hear all criminal cases that have occurred in the county as well as limited jurisdiction over civil cases. The County Court handles felony cases exclusively and shares jurisdiction with the town and village justice courts on misdemeanor cases and other minor offenses and violations. The County Court's jurisdiction on civil cases is limited to those involving less than $25,000.

The Historic Putnam County Courthouse is located in the town of Carmel. Built in 1814 in Greek Revival style, it is the second oldest working courthouse in New York, second to the one in Johnstown. Portico and pillars were added to the structure in the 1840s. It was recently extensively remodeled to preserve the structure and adapt it for use as the Surrogate's Court.

The bew Putnam County Courthouse opened on January 2, 2008. It was constructed at a cost of $22.8 million. Jury assembly, court clerks and a public law library are located on the first floor. The second floor includes a Family Court and hearing room. On all floors are judges' chambers, jury deliberation rooms, prisoner cells and conference rooms. The third floor has two courtrooms for the County Court. The Supreme Court and a law library occupy the fourth floor.

Law enforcement
Law enforcement is providing by the following departments:

 State-side: K Troop, New York State Police (Zone 2, based on Route 22, at the Brewster Barracks)
 County-side: Putnam County Sheriff's Department
 Town/Village-side: Philipstown: (Village of Cold Spring Police Department), Southeast: (Village of Brewster Police Department), Town of Carmel Police Department, Town of Kent Police Department, and the Putnam County Probation Department.
The Putnam County Sheriff's Office includes a Civil Bureau, patrol division, a marine unit, a motorcycle unit, a school resource unit, and a narcotics enforcement unit.

County Sheriff
The current Sheriff, Kevin McConville (Republican Party) was elected on November 3, 2021. The Sheriff's Department includes a Civil Bureau, patrol division, a marine unit, a motorcycle unit, a school resource unit, and a narcotics enforcement unit.

State and national government

|}
Putnam County is part of the 94th State Assembly District (Towns of Carmel, Patterson, Putnam Valley and Southeast), represented by Kevin M. Byrne (R), and the 95th State Assembly District (Towns of Kent and Phillipstown), represented by Sandra R. Galef (D).

Putnam County is part of the 40th State Senate District (Towns of Carmel, Patterson and Southeast), represented by Peter Harckham (D), and the 41st State Senate District (Towns of Kent, Phillipstown and Putnam Valley), represented by Susan J. Serino (R).

Putnam County is located in the 18th congressional district and has been represented by Democratic United States Congressman Sean Patrick Maloney since 2013. He unseated Republican Congresswoman Nan Hayworth.

Putnam County has voted solidly for Republican presidential candidates, largely bucking the Democratic trend in the New York City suburbs. Since the Civil War, the only Democratic presidential nominees to carry Putnam County have been New Yorker Horatio Seymour in 1868, Woodrow Wilson in 1912 and Lyndon B. Johnson in 1964.

Geography

Putnam County is situated in the lower Hudson Valley in the southeastern part of New York, between the Hudson River on its west and the New York-Connecticut border on its east.
Putnam is southeast of Newburgh, and it is north of White Plains.

The terrain of the county is generally hilly. The region of the county nearest the Hudson River is especially so, and is part of the Hudson Highlands. The highest point in Putnam County is Scofield Ridge, with four summits at approximately 1,540 feet (469 m) above sea level. The lowest point is sea level along the Hudson.
The Hudson River, named for Henry Hudson, has provided transportation of goods from New York City, north to the Hudson Valley, throughout history. Between the hills and glacial moraine, Putnam County's valleys contain numerous wetlands (including part of the Great Swamp), creeks, ponds, lakes (including the 583 acre Lake Mahopac, and reservoirs.

Reservoirs

Putnam County is known for its many pristine reservoirs, part of the New York City water supply system's Croton Watershed. These include Bog Brook in Southeast; Croton Falls Reservoir in Carmel and Southeast; Diverting Reservoir in Southeast; East Branch in Brewster; Middle Branch Reservoir in Southeast; West Branch in Kent and Carmel, and Boyds Corner Reservoir in Kent.  There are also three controlled lakes in the system in the town of Carmel, Kirk, Gilead, and Gleneida.

Adjacent counties
 Dutchess County (north)
 Fairfield County, Connecticut (east)
 Westchester County (south)
 Rockland County (southwest)
 Orange County (west)

Climate
The climate of Putnam County is humid continental, as is most of New York. In the winter, bouts of cold, dry air arrive from Canada, and interior sections of North America. In the summer, the Gulf Stream brings hot, moist, humid air to the county. Extratropical storms often affect the county; in the winter, Nor'easters bring heavy snow and rain, and sometimes high wind. In the summer and fall, back door cold fronts move in from the north and bring thunderstorms, sometimes severe. Putnam County receives on average 36 inches of snowfall a year.

Demographics

|}

According to the 2020 Census, there were 97,668 people and 38,713 households in the county, with 2.76 persons per household. The racial makeup of the county was 77.1% White alone, not Hispanic or Latino, 3.9% Black or African American, 0.5% Native American, 2.3% Asian, 0.1% Pacific Islander, 3.0% from other races, 1.8% from two or more races and 16.4% Hispanic or Latino of any race. 12.9% of the population was foreign born.

4.5% of the population was under the age of 5, 19.4% under the age of 18, and 18.0% were 65 years of age or older. The median age was 43.4 years.

The median income for a household in the county was $104,486, and the per capita income was $47,448. 5.2% of the population was in poverty.

93% of the population at least 25 years old had a high school degree or higher, and 39.6% had a bachelor's degree or higher.

There were 38,713 housing units, 81.8% of which were owner occupied. As of Q4 2021, the median value of all homes in Putnam County was $419,890, an increase of 12.1% from the prior year.

2020 Census

Education
The county has the following public school districts:
 Brewster Central School District
 Carmel Central School District
 Garrison Union Free School District
 Haldane Central School District
 Lakeland Central School District
 Mahopac Central School District
 North Salem Central School District
 Pawling Central School District
 Putnam Valley Central School District

Mahopac is the largest school district in Putnam County, educating more than 5,000 students in four elementary schools, a middle school, and a high school (1600 students).

Saint Basil Academy, a private boarding facility, functioned as a private school with in-house instruction until 1997.

The library system consists of eight libraries; the Brewster Public Library in Brewster; the Kent Public Library in Kent; the Reed Memorial Library in Carmel; the Julia L. Butterfield Memorial Library in Cold Spring; the Alice Curtis Desmond and Hamilton Fish Library in Garrison; the Mahopac Public Library in Mahopac; the Patterson Library in Patterson, and the Putnam Valley Free Library in Putnam Valley.

 SUNY Westchester Community College holds some general education classes at Mahopac High School.

Infrastructure
Putnam County was provided with the majority of its electricity by the nuclear Indian Point Energy Center in Westchester County.

Water is supplied from wells, lakes, or the Hudson River.

The Putnam Hospital Center, located in Carmel, serves the eastern county. Western Putnam County is mainly served by hospitals in Dutchess or Westchester counties.

Transportation

The county has several passenger trains that serve the county. The Harlem Line and the Hudson Line of the Metro-North Railroad run north–south in Putnam. The Harlem Line makes stops at Brewster, Southeast, and Patterson. The Hudson Line makes stops at Manitou, Garrison, Cold Spring, and Breakneck Ridge.  A connection to Amtrak can be made to the south at Croton-Harmon in upper Westchester County or to the north at Poughkeepsie in Dutchess County, both on the Hudson Line. Grand Central Terminal in Manhattan is roughly a one-hour train ride.

Until May 1958, a third commuter line, the New York Central’s Putnam Division, operating between the Bronx and points in the county, served the region. With no direct connection to Grand Central Terminal (a transfer was required in the Bronx), ridership on the line was weak compared to its counterparts. Freight service was also scant. The line was eventually abandoned in waves between 1962 and 1980. The former railbed has been converted to trails, and now serves as the South County Trailway, North County Trailway, and Putnam County Trailway rail trails.

Putnam Transit, operated by the county, provides local public transportation.

In contrast to the surrounding counties, Putnam has no airport.

Major roadways 

Putnam has two interstate highways. The east–west Interstate 84 comes in from the north near Ludingtonville, and connects to the southbound Interstate 684 in Southeast toward the Connecticut border. The Taconic State Parkway runs north–south through central Putnam. Three of the region's major east–west routes traverse the eastern half of the county. NY 52 enters alongside I-84 from Dutchess County, to end at US 6 south of Carmel. East of Brewster, US 6 joins US 202 and the routes leave the county and state concurrently aside the interstate.

Points of interest

Chuang Yen Monastery, located in Kent, is home to the largest indoor Buddha statue in the Western Hemisphere. It has the only library in the United States specializing in Buddhist history.

Clarence Fahnestock State Park is a  natural area containing over 50 miles of trails for walking and hiking, including nine miles of the Appalachian Trail. Donald J. Trump State Park (currently closed) is a  park located in Putnam and Westchester counties. A small ski resort, Thunder Ridge Ski Area, with 30 trails and three lifts is located in the town of Patterson.

Media
The Journal News serves the region known as the Lower Hudson Valley, which comprises Westchester County, Rockland County, and Putnam County.  The Journal News is owned by Gannett Company, Inc. Before Gannett merged its local dailies into the Journal News, Putnam County was served by an edition of the Reporter Dispatch.

Putnam County newsreaders were served for generations by the Putnam County News and Recorder, formerly an independently owned newspaper devoted to local affairs. The oversized broadsheet – measuring seventeen by twenty inches – was first published in Cold Spring as The Recorder in 1866. In July 2008, the local ownership sold the paper to Roger Ailes, chairman of Fox News, who named his wife Elizabeth as the new publisher. The paper altered its editorial content substantially, generating local controversy. In 2009 the Ailes family also purchased the Putnam County Courier, when it was shut down by Journal Register Co. (The first issue after publication resumed listed Roger Ailes as owner and chairman, but Elizabeth Ailes has since been identified as the owner). The Courier was first established as the Putnam County Democrat in 1841. Under Ailes ownership, the Courier closed its Carmel office. The News and Recorder remained a full broadsheet, with a 17-inch-wide front page, until 2017. Both newspapers are now standard-sized broadsheets. The two newspapers share an editor and many of the same stories appear in both. Douglas Cunningham, editor-in-chief of the Courier and News and Recorder since 2011, purchased the two papers from the Ailes in December 2016 and became publisher.

Two other weeklies are the Putnam County Times (historically Times & Republican) and Putnam County Press, virtually identical except that the former is distributed free. Both have been owned since 1958 by Don Hall. Hall and Roger Ailes, though both Republicans, are bitter rivals. Hall had long derided Ailes as a part-time resident. When Ailes faced harassment allegations, leading to his ouster from Fox News, his Putnam County connection contributed to his being featured on the front pages of the Times and Press.

In 2010, Gordon Stewart, a businessman living in Garrison, launched a news website to compete with the Ailes-owned PCNR called Philipstown.info. In 2012 a print version was launched called The Paper. Shortly Stewart's death in 2014, the publication became a nonprofit led by a board of directors. It changed its name in 2016 to The Highlands Current to reflect its coverage of neighboring Beacon.

Communities
There are six towns and three incorporated villages in Putnam County. There are no cities:

Towns

Carmel

Carmel is the largest town of Putnam County, with a population of 34,300. The Town of Carmel includes the hamlets of the county seat Carmel, Carmel Hills, Field Corners, Hopkins Corners, Mahopac, Mahopac Falls, Secor Corners, Tilly Foster, and West Mahopac. Carmel is along the southern border of Putnam County.

Carmel is known for its historic courthouse and high school, which serves grades 9–12. Carmel was taken in 1795 from Frederickstown, a town which encompassed the present towns of Kent, Patterson, and Carmel.

Kent

Kent is a town located along the northern border of Putnam with a population of 14,000. Kent contains the hamlets of Lake Carmel, Kent Corners, Kent Hills, and Ludingtonville. Kent was the last remaining section of Frederickstown, after the towns of Carmel and Patterson were divided from it in 1795. Frederickstown was founded in 1788.

Patterson

The Town of Patterson is located in the northeast area of Putnam County and has a population of 12,000. Patterson, originally named Franklin, was divided from the former town of Frederickstown, in 1795. Patterson contains the hamlets of Patterson, Barnum Corners, Camp Brady, Fields Corners, Haines Corners, Haviland Hollow, Putnam Lake, Steinbeck Corners, Towners, and West Patterson.

Philipstown

Philipstown is a town located along the western end of Putnam County and it has a population of 10,000. Philipstown contains the villages and hamlets of Cold Spring, Forsonville, Garrison, Garrison Four Corners, Glenclyffe, Manitou, McKeel Corners, Nelsonville, North Highlands,  Storm King, and the north side of Continental Village. It was founded in 1788. West Point (in Orange County) is located across the Hudson River from the village of Cold Spring.
It has three stations on the Metro North Railroad Hudson line: in Garrison, Cold Spring and Manitou, which has limited train service.

Two public libraries are located in Philipstown: the Desmond-Fish Library in Garrison and the Julia L. Butterfield Library in Cold Spring.

Putnam Valley

Putnam Valley is a town located on the southern border of Putnam County with a population of 11,000. Putnam Valley contains the hamlets of Adams Corners, Christian Corners, Gilbert Corners, Lake Peekskill, Oscawana Corners, Putnam Valley, Tompkins Corners, Sunnybrook.

Putnam Valley was created in 1835 as the Town Of Quincy, taking its current name the following year. The town was created by splitting off from Philipstown. Putnam Valley is home to the Clarence Fahnestock State Park, which covers much of Putnam County and some of Dutchess County.

Southeast

The Town of Southeast is located in the southeastern corner of Putnam County, with a population of 18,000. It was founded in 1788 as one of the three original towns in what would later become Putnam County. Its shape changed greatly in 1795, when it lost its northern half to Patterson and gained a great amount on its western side.

It is the second-largest town in Putnam County, second only to Carmel. The crossroads of Interstate highways 684 and 84; State Routes 22 and 312; and US Highways 6 and 202 are located here. Metro-North Railroad's Harlem Line has two stops that service the area, at Brewster Village and Southeast Station (formerly Brewster North) off Route 312. Southeast contains the village of Brewster, and the hamlets of Brewster Hill, Brewster Heights, Deans Corners, Deforest Corners, Drewville Heights, Dykemans, Milltown, Peach Lake, Sears Corners, and Sodom.

Villages

Brewster

Brewster is an incorporated village within the Town of Southeast.

Cold Spring

Cold Spring is an incorporated village surrounded by the Town of Philipstown and the village of Nelsonville.

Nelsonville

Nelsonville is an incorporated village surrounded by the Town of Philipstown and the village of Cold Spring.

Census-designated places
 Brewster Heights
 Brewster Hill
 Carmel
 Lake Carmel
 Mahopac
 Peach Lake (shared with Westchester County)
 Putnam Lake

Other hamlets
 Farmers Mills
 Garrison
 Gayville
 Lake Peekskill
 Ludingtonville
 Tompkins Corners

Ghost towns
 Dicktown
 Doanesburgh
 Towners

See also

 The 25th Annual Putnam County Spelling Bee
 Downstate New York
 Hudson Valley
 List of counties in New York
 National Register of Historic Places listings in Putnam County, New York
 New York metropolitan area

References

Further reading

External links

 Putnam County, New York site
 
 Summary early history of Putnam County
 The Highlands Current (newspaper)
 Cold Spring Visitor Guide
 Fishkill Creek Watershed Committee
 Southeast Museum Brewster, NY
 Friends of Tilly Foster, Southeast NY
 Historic Patterson, the History of the Town of Patterson, Putnam County, NY
 Desmond-Fish Library, Garrison, Putnam County, NY
 The Manitou School, Garrison
 Hudson Valley Directory, listings pertaining to Putnam County, New York

 
1812 establishments in New York (state)
Counties in the New York metropolitan area
Populated places established in 1812